Hugh Hilley (19 March 1899 – 14 September 1987) was a Scottish footballer, who played as a left back for Celtic from 1921 to 1928. He won the Scottish Football League championship in 1925–26, either side of Scottish Cup victories in 1925 and 1927, as well as one winner's medal each in the Glasgow Cup and Glasgow Merchants Charity Cup.

Noted for his energy and bravery on the field, in 1927 it was reported that he had suffered some kind of nervous breakdown brought on by exhaustion. He recovered, but decided to give up playing, and later operated an ice-cream shop in Townhead, Glasgow.

References

Scottish footballers
Footballers from Glasgow
Scottish Junior Football Association players
Scottish Football League players
Scottish Football League representative players
St Anthony's F.C. players
Celtic F.C. players
1899 births
1987 deaths
Association football defenders